This is a list of estuaries in South Africa. The list is in order from East (border with Mozambique) to the West (border with Namibia).

The South African coastline stretches for some 3000 km from Kosi Bay near the Mozambique border in the east to the Gariep (Orange) River at the Namibian border in the west. Some 300 river outlets intersect this coastline and these range from small water bodies that are only occasionally connected to the ocean, to large, permanently open systems, and coastal lakes connected to the sea via a narrow channel (Heydorn, 1991). Being places where rivers meet the sea, estuaries are one of the most important features of the South African coastline; they are tranquil areas of high productivity and play a vital role in the life cycles of many plants and animals.
Apart from their ecological importance, estuaries are also popular sites for human activity and development. Recreational uses of estuaries include bait collection, bird watching, boating, fishing and swimming. Because of their great aesthetic value, areas around estuaries are often favoured for housing and tourist developments.

List of estuaries in South Africa

See also 

 List of Bays of South Africa
 List of rivers of South Africa
 List of reservoirs and dams in South Africa
 List of lakes in South Africa
 List of lagoons of South Africa
 List of Islands of South Africa

References 
 South Africa Environmental Affairs Department

Bodies of water of South Africa
Estuaries
Estuaries of Africa